The Empire Football League (EFL) is a semi-professional American football league with franchises based primarily in New York State. The league was established in 1969. Many franchises have come and gone including in locations such as Pennsylvania, Vermont, and Connecticut as well as Quebec, Montreal,  and Ontario in Canada. In 2018 the league included six teams: the Glens Falls Greenjackets, Hudson Valley Mountaineers, Plattsburgh North Stars, Seaway Valley Venom, Tri City Spartans, and Utica Yard Dogs.

Ray Seals transitioned from the EFL to the National Football League (NFL) in 1989. Several members of the Syracuse 8 that challenged disparities for African Americans at Syracuse University's football program played for the Tri City Jets of Binghamton, New York. The team was a farm team for the New York Jets at the time and some of them went for a tryout with the Jets, but according to one of them they understood they had no chance when Jets coach Weeb Ewbank identified them as "those boys from Syracuse" during roll call.

The league's most dominant team has been the Scranton Eagles who have won a record 11 championships, 10 of those coming between the years 1982 and 1994.

History
The league was organized during the winter of 1968 and started in 1969. The Hudson Falls Greenjackets were the first champions, after finishing with a 7-1 record.
 
In 1989 Ray Seals transitioned from the EFL's Syracuse Express to the Tampa Bay Buccaneers in the National Football League (NFL). As a linebacker he blocked the pass from Brett Favre that Favre caught for his very first completion in the NFL.

The Watertown Red and Black left the league in 2017 when the EFL was down to two teams. The league held an emergency meeting when it was left with just the Seaway Valley Venom and the Glens Falls Greenjackets.

The Hudson Valley Mountaineers joined the league in 2018.

In 2018 Kevin Siska of the Glens Falls Greenjackets was inducted into the American Football Association Minor League Football Hall of Fame.

The team canceled its 2020 season amid the COVID-19 pandemic. For the 2021 season Utica, Hudson Valley and Sussex decided to join other leagues, so the league decided to split into 2 divisions to cut down on travel costs. Eastern Division included Glens Falls Greenjackets, Plattsburgh North Stars and Tri City Spartans, while the West Division consist Syracuse Smash, Watertown Red & Black and Northern New York Grizzlies. West division champs Watertown beat East division champs Glens Falls 37-8 in the final. In 2023 the league announced the Watertown Red & Black would be leaving the EFL and joining the GDFL.

Current teams
 Auburn Pride of Auburn, New York
 Broome County Stallions of Apalachin, New York
 Glens Falls Greenjackets of Glens Falls, New York
 Plattsburgh North Stars North Stars of Plattsburgh, New York
 Syracuse Smash of Syracuse, New York

Prior franchises

 Watertown Red & Black
 Albany Metro Mallers
 Amsterdam Zephyrs
 Berkshire Mountaineers
 Berwick Colts
 Binghamton Jets
 Broome County Dragons
 Capitaland Thunder
 Chenango Storm
 Connecticut Chiefs
 Dutchess County Checkmates
 Glens Falls Greenjackets
 Glove Cities Colonials
 Hudson Vikings (Columbia County)
 Hudson Falls Greenjackets
 Kingston Panthers
 Marlboro Shamrocks
 Massena Warriors
 Massena Silver and Black Raiders
 Montreal Condors
 Montreal Voyaguers
 New England Crusaders
 New York Stallions
 Newburgh Raiders
 Oneonta Indians
 Oneida Silver Bullets
 Orange County Bulldogs
 Ottawa Bootleggers
 Ottawa Demon Deacons
 Plattsburg Northstars (Lake City Stars)
 Quebec Titans
 Rochester Sting
 Rotterdam Eagles
 Reading Raptors
 Scranton Eagles
 Schenectady Chargers
 Seaway Valley Venom
 Salt City Aces
 Syracuse Vipers
 Syracuse Shock
 Syracuse Storm
 Syracuse Strong
 Triple Cities Jets
 St. Lawrence Trailblazers
 Toronto Raiders
 Troy Uncle Sammies
 Troy Giants
 Troy Titans
 Utica Mustangs
 Utica Nighthawks
 Utica Yardogs
 Vermont Ice Storm
 Vermont Muddogs (Casselton)

Champions

See also
Seaboard Football League
Atlantic Coast Football League
Alliance of American Football
Empire Football League Champions

References

External links 
Official Website

Sport in Quebec
Sport in Ontario
Semi-professional American football
American football in New York (state)
American football leagues in the United States
American football leagues in Canada
American football in Pennsylvania
American football in Vermont